Jamal Deh (also Romanized as Jamāl Deh) is a village in Piveh Zhan Rural District, Ahmadabad District, Mashhad County, Razavi Khorasan Province, Iran. At the 2006 census, its population was 301, in 74 families.

References 

Populated places in Mashhad County